Tomáš Cihlář (born 1967) is a Czech biochemist known for his role in the development of remdesivir. A specialist in virology, Cihlář holds the positions of Senior Director, Biology, and Vice-President at American pharmaceutical company Gilead Sciences. As a student, Cihlář assisted fellow biochemist Antonín Holý in developing Viread, the primary drug used to fight HIV infection.

Education
Cihlář graduated from the University of Chemistry and Technology, Prague, majoring in fermentation chemistry and bioengineering under the tutelage of Jan Páca and Vladimír Jirků. He completed his postgraduate studies at the Institute of Organic Chemistry and Biochemistry of the ASCR under Ivan Rosenberg and Ivan Votruba. In 1994 he obtained the title of Candidate of Sciences and was engaged in the research of antiviral agents under the tutelage of Antonín Holý.

That same year, he traveled to the United States for a postdoctoral fellowship with Gilead Sciences, where as researcher he worked on the development of antiviral nucleotide analogs including tenofovir disoproxil fumarate, which, marketed as Viread, has become a primary drug in the fight against HIV infection.

Career
At Gilead, leading a team of hundreds of scientists working on new substances for the treatment of HIV, viral hepatitis B, respiratory infections and other viral diseases such as Ebola, MERS, and dengue fever, Cihlář is as of 2020 responsible for biological research on HIV and respiratory viruses. On a number of these projects, he continues to work closely with scientists from the Institute of Organic Chemistry and Biochemistry, particularly Zdeněk Havlas and Zdeněk Hostomský, and with the Radim Nencka Group, which develops compounds capable of stopping the replication of important human pathogens by blocking the remodeling of cell membranes induced by these viruses.

Cihlář is engaged in ongoing research into HIV inhibitors that target the enzyme integrase and prevent the formation of viral capsids. Recently, these entail low molecular weight agonists of TLR7 (toll-like receptor 7). TLR7 receptors recognize single-stranded RNA in endosomes and play a role in innate antiviral immunity. Such substances should help eliminate the HIV reservoir in T-lymphocytes and completely cure HIV patients.

In 2006, Cihlář received a William Prusoff Young Investigator Lecture Award from the International Society for Antiviral Research for his work on antiviral nucleotide analogs. He has patented dozens of novel inventions.

Remdesivir
Also at Gilead, Cihlář is one of the company's lead researchers in the development of remdesivir, originally intended for treatment of Ebola. However, the Ebola epidemic ended before the new drug could be tested. Remdesivir briefly showed considerable promise in treating COVID-19 infection; in April 2020 the company provided 5,000 doses for experimental use in China and four hundred patients in 50 other countries. Remdesivir was used to treat the first confirmed case of coronavirus in the U.S.

In North Bethesda, Maryland, the National Institute of Allergy and Infectious Diseases conducted a trial involving 1,063 patients, some of whom were given the drug while others received a placebo. "The data shows remdesivir has a clear-cut, significant, positive effect in diminishing the time to recovery", NIAID director Dr. Anthony Fauci said. "What it has proven is a drug can block this virus," Fauci added, "opening the door to the fact that we now have the capability of treating patients." A week earlier, the WHO released, then retracted results from remdesivir trials in China finding the drug had "absolutely no benefit" for coronavirus patients. Fauci stated that the WHO report was "not an adequate study", citing the fact that the trials were halted early due to a lack of volunteers.

In early June 2020 it was reported that AstraZeneca, a British-Swedish multinational pharmaceutical and biopharmaceutical company headquartered in Cambridge, England, was pursuing a merger with Gilead due to a shared interest in the potential of remdesivir.

In September 2020, following a review of purported evidence, the WHO’s guidelines committee issued a statement that there was no evidence of benefit, adding that Covid patients may be better off without it. The statement, published in The BMJ, concludes, "Any beneficial effects of remdesivir, if they do exist, are likely to be small and the possibility of important harm remains.” In October 2020, recognizing his involvement in the development of Remdesivir, which was thought potentially effective in treating Covid-19, Czech president Miloš Zeman awarded Cihlář the country's Silver Medal of Merit.

In April 2021 Cihlář discussed the possibility of marketing remdesivir in pill form.

References

Notes

Citations

Further reading 
 Anon., "A broad-spectrum antiviral drug would be ideal, says Tomáš Cihlář, who is developing remdesivir" (interview), ČT24, May 15, 2020.
 Langreth, R., "All Eyes on Gilead", Bloomberg Businessweek, May 14, 2020.
 Šálek, M., "Molekula naděje" (The Molecule of Hope), Reportér Magazín (in Czech), April 5, 2020.

External links
 

Czech biochemists
Czech virologists
Living people
20th-century chemists
20th-century biologists
21st-century chemists
21st-century biologists
University of Chemistry and Technology, Prague alumni
Scientists from Plzeň
1967 births
Recipients of Medal of Merit (Czech Republic)
Institute of Organic Chemistry and Biochemistry of the CAS